"L'estate sta finendo" is a song by the Italian Italo disco duo Righeira that was released as a non-album single in May 1985. It was written by singers Johnson Righeira and Michael Righeira and producer Carmelo La Bionda. Released as the duo's fifth single in 1985 on the record label CGD, it reached number one in Italy. It was the winning song at the Festivalbar in 1985 as the most popular song of the summer.

Football chants based on the song are popularly sung by football fans in many European clubs. The chants are referred to as "Un giorno all'improvviso" from their opening line in Italy, and in English clubs it is known as "Allez Allez Allez" from its chorus.

Background 

The song was written by the duo Johnson Righeira and Michael Righeira, and Carmelo La Bionda of the group La Bionda. It was produced by Carmelo and Michelangelo La Bionda and released under the label CGD Dischi. The song reached number one in Italy in August 1985 where it stayed for two weeks. 

The song was the winning song at the Festivalbar in 1985 as the most-played jukebox song of the summer nationwide in Italy that year.

Commercial performance 

The song reached a peak of number 35 in Germany, where it remained for one week, before spending a total of 10 weeks on the chart. On the Swiss Singles Chart, "L'estate sta finendo" debuted at number 23 in the issue dated 1 September 1985. After three weeks, the song reached number 18, remaining there for one week. In Italy, the song spent two consecutive weeks at the top of the Musica e dischi charts.

As football chant 

The use of the song as football chant has its origin in L'Aquila, a city hit by an earthquake in 2009. Righi performed the song for a concert in the city a few years later, this song was picked up afterwards by the ultras of the city's football club L'Aquila Calcio 1927 called the Red-Blue Eagles, who used it as a chant that starts with the line "Un giorno all'improvviso" (one sudden day). Their chant was adopted by fans of other Italian clubs such as Genoa, Juventus, and Napoli, and then spread to other clubs in Europe such as Atlético Madrid, Rangers and Porto.

The chant by Porto fans going to a UEFA Europa League match in 2016 against Borussia Dortmund was noticed by Liverpool fans, who created their own version as "Allez Allez Allez".  Jamie Webster, who heard the chant during Liverpool's match against Porto, then sang and recorded a version. It became popular during Liverpool's 2017–18 UEFA Champions League campaign, especially after a win against Manchester City in the quarter final. The song reached number 39 on the UK Singles Downloads Chart. This version has since been adapted for use by fans of a number of clubs in English football.

Track listing and formats 

 Italian 7-inch single

A. "L'estate sta finendo" – 3:30
B. "Prima dell'estate" – 3:30

 Italian 12-inch single

A. "L'estate sta finendo" – 5:02
B1. "Prima dell'estate" – 2:25
B2. "L'estate sta finendo" – 3:45

 German 7-inch single

A. "L'estate sta finendo" – 3:48
B. "Prima dell'estate" – 2:58

 Dutch 7-inch single

A. "L'estate sta finendo" – 3:45
B. "Prima dell'estate" – 2:52

Credits and personnel 

 Johnson Righeira – songwriter, vocals
 Michael Righeira – songwriter, vocals
 Carmelo La Bionda – songwriter, producer
 Michelangelo La Bionda – producer
 Guido Harari – cover art, photographer

Credits and personnel adapted from the 7-inch single liner notes.

Charts

Weekly charts

Certifications and sales

See also 

 List of number-one hits of 1985 (Italy)

References

Sources

External links 

 
 
 
 

1985 songs
1985 singles
Association football songs and chants
Compagnia Generale del Disco singles
Italian-language songs
Number-one singles in Italy
Righeira songs
Song recordings produced by La Bionda
Songs written by Johnson Righeira
Songs written by Michael Righeira